Civilian is the eleventh and final studio album by the British band Gentle Giant, released in 1980. It was recorded at Sound City Studios in the Van Nuys neighborhood of Los Angeles with former Beatles engineer Geoff Emerick. Consisting mostly of short rock songs, it is closer to a traditional rock sound than the progressive style for which the band is best known. The album also marked a return to Columbia Records in the U.S. and Canada after an eight-year hiatus; the band's last album released with Columbia had been 1972's Octopus.

The album peaked at No. 203 on the Billboard 200. Soon after the album's release, Gentle Giant played a final tour and then split up.

A previously unreleased track, "Heroes No More", has been included on some CD reissues of the album. Another track from the same period, "You Haven't a Chance", appeared on the compilation album Under Construction 17 years later.

Critical reception
Reviewing the 2006 Gentle Giant reissues, The Village Voice deemed Civilian "bland" and a bomb "that destroyed the band."

Track listing
All lead vocals by Derek Shulman, except "Shadows on the Street", sung by Kerry Minnear.

Personnel
Gentle Giant
Gary Green – electric guitars on all tracks except track 3
Kerry Minnear – synthesizers (tracks 1–7, 9), electric piano (tracks 1, 3-9), Hammond organ (tracks 2, 3, 9), Clavinet (track 7), piano (track 3), lead vocals on track 3
Derek Shulman – lead vocals on all tracks except track 3
Ray Shulman – bass, acoustic guitar (tracks 5, 6), backing vocals
John Weathers – drums, tambourine (tracks 4–6, 8, 9), varispeed cymbals (track 1), percussion (track 7), backing vocals

Charts

Notes

References

1980 albums
Gentle Giant albums
Chrysalis Records albums
Columbia Records albums
Albums recorded at Sound City Studios